The 1954 British Empire and Commonwealth Games were held in Vancouver, British Columbia, from 30 July to 7 August 1954. These were the first games since the name change from British Empire Games took effect in 1952.

It was at these games that the "Miracle Mile" took place between Roger Bannister and John Landy at Empire Stadium. This was the first time these two (and at that time the only two) sub-four-minute mile runners appeared in the same race, and also the first time two runners broke four minutes in the same race. On the same afternoon, Jim Peters, the holder of the world best time for the marathon, entered the stadium 17 minutes ahead of his nearest rival, but collapsed on his final lap, and never completed the race.

The games were attended by 24 nations and 662 competitors.

Venues

Opening and Closing Ceremonies, Athletics: Empire Stadium, Hastings Park
Bowls: West Point Grey Club, New West Club
Boxing: Exhibition Forum, Pacific National Exhibition
Cycling: Empire Oval (Track), 1155 East Broadway (Road)
Fencing: Lord Byng School, West Point Grey
Rowing: Vedder Canal, Chilliwack
Swimming and Diving: Empire Pool, University of British Columbia, West Point Grey
Weightlifting: Exhibition Gardens, Pacific National Exhibition
Wrestling: Kerrisdale Arena
Athletes' Village: University of British Columbia, West Point Grey

Participating teams

24 teams were represented at the 1954 British Empire and Commonwealth Games.(Teams competing for the first time are shown in bold).

Medal table

Medal winners

Athletics

Bowls

Boxing

Cycling

Track

+ Lionel Cox did not receive a silver medal, the Australian cycling team refused to participate in the gold and bronze medal playoffs and were subsequently disqualified.

Road

Fencing

Rowing

Swimming

Men's events

Women's events

Diving

Weightlifting

Wrestling

References

External links
 "Vancouver 1954". Thecgf.com. Commonwealth Games Federation.
 "Results and Medalists—1954 British Empire and Commonwealth Games". Thecgf.com. Commonwealth Games Federation.
British Empire and Commonwealth Games, a National Film Board of Canada documentary about the 1954 Games.

 
British Empire and Commonwealth Games
British Empire and Commonwealth Games
History of Vancouver
International sports competitions hosted by Canada
Commonwealth Games in Canada
British Empire and Commonwealth Games
Commonwealth Games by year
British Empire and Commonwealth Games
British Empire and Commonwealth Games
1950s in Vancouver
British Empire and Commonwealth Games